The Babe Ruth League is an international youth baseball and softball league based in Hamilton, New Jersey, US named after George Herman "Babe" Ruth.

The parent program, Babe Ruth League, Incorporated, is a non-profit, tax-exempt organization.

Babe Ruth League has increased steadily from its first 10-team league in Hamilton Township, New Jersey, to its present combined size of well over one million players on some 60,000+ teams in more than 11,000 leagues and over 1.9 million volunteers. The Babe Ruth League consists of five divisions: Cal Ripken Baseball (ages 4–12), Babe Ruth Baseball (ages 13–18), Babe Ruth Softball (ages 4–18), Bambino Buddy Ball (ages 5–20), and Xtreme Fastpitch (ages 6–18).

Baseball Hall of Fame inductees who played Babe Ruth League include Carl Yastrzemski, Joe Morgan, Jim Palmer, Rod Carew, George Brett, Nolan Ryan, Cal Ripken Jr., Frank Thomas, Randy Johnson, John Smoltz, and Mike Piazza.

History
In 1951, ten men who believed that the future of their community depended upon the proper development of the young people met at the historic Yardville Hotel in Hamilton, New Jersey, for the purpose of developing a baseball program for young men between 13 and 15 years of age. Babe Ruth League, Inc. recognizes Marius D. Bonacci as the Founding Father of the program, along with the contribution of the following nine men, Samuel M. Welch, Ferdinand J. Wagner, Ed Jones, Ted Jasek, Cliff Fovour, Boots Snyder, William Dombrowski, Maskill Paxson and Willard Carson Jr. Originally organized under the name Little Bigger League, Claire Merritt Ruth, the widow of Babe Ruth, met with the league's organizers in 1954 and authorized them to rename the league in Ruth's honor.

In 1974, the 13-Year-Old Prep League was added. The Prep League allows 13-year-old players to make the transition to the regulation size diamond, while competing with peers their own age.

In 1982, Babe Ruth Baseball added yet another division to its program, the Bambino division for players ages 4–12.

In 1984, Babe Ruth League, Inc. added another dimension to its program, Babe Ruth Softball. The Softball Division encompasses players 4 to 18 years of age. The program was organized because Babe Ruth League, Inc. saw a need for a quality national softball program. The softball program was designed to focus on all ability levels of young female athletes, providing them with the same enriching athletic experience as the baseball divisions.

July 6, 1999 was the beginning of a new era for Babe Ruth League, Inc. The Bambino Division was renamed "Cal Ripken Baseball, a Division of Babe Ruth League, Inc." Cal Ripken Jr.'s visions and philosophies, molded by his father, Cal Ripken Sr., directly parallel those of Babe Ruth League, Inc. Now two of the most prolific legends and heroes in baseball inspire in our youth participants their knowledge, spirit and pure passion for the game.

In 2000 the Buddy-Ball Division for players ages 5–20 who are physically and/or mentally challenged was renamed the Bambino BuddyBall Division. A "buddy" helps the player swing a bat, round the bases, catch a ball.

2013 saw the addition of Xtreme Fastpitch to accommodate all softball participants—those who wish to play on a recreational level to those who seek a higher degree of competition to hone their skills with the goal of continuing play into high school and beyond.

Divisions

Cal Ripken Baseball (Formerly Known As Bambino Division)

Major/70 

Features a 50' pitching distance and 70' base paths, this division is offered as an option to the major division format, and includes a tournament trail from District competition through the World Series in Branson, Missouri featuring eight International Champions.

Major/60 
Features a 46' pitching distance and 60' base paths. Special base running rules are also in effect. This division is offered as an option to the major division format, and includes a tournament trail from District competition through the World Series.

Minors 
Recommended for ballplayers ages 9–10. Players build and refine their fundamental skills while beginning to understand game strategy and teamwork. In most regions, participants first experience post-season tournament competition in this level, leading to the 10 Year-Old World Series.

Rookie 
Designed primarily for ballplayers ages 7–8, this division makes use of a pitching machine to allow for more hittable balls at the plate and more action in the field. Fear of actually being hit by a pitched ball is diminished. It makes the game safer and improves the playing confidence and ability of all participants.

T-Ball 
Ballplayers ages 4–6 learn hitting and fielding fundamentals in a supportive team environment. Young athletes hit the ball from a batting tee which is height-adjusted for a level swing, batting in order through the line-up for the entire game. The primary goal is to begin to instruct young players in the fundamentals of baseball in a supportive team environment.

Babe Ruth Baseball

13–15 
Also known as Senior Babe Ruth Baseball, Babe Ruth Baseball was created for ballplayers ages 13–15 who wished to continue their baseball playing experience beyond the age of 12. This is where players get their baseball cleats muddy for the first time on standard 90' diamonds under Official Baseball Rules used by Major League Baseball. In this division, teams are eligible to enter tournament competition and move along the tournament trail, culminating in a World Series. Three World Series are held in this division: one for 13 year-old players, one for 13 and 14 year-old players, and the 13–15 World Series. In 2019, the 13–15 World Series was held in Bismarck, ND and was attended by several former participants from the 1969 winning team, including Scott MacGregor.

13 Year-Old Prep 
Players often express a fear of competing with 14 and 15 year-old players who have already experienced one or two years playing on a standard 90' diamond. Babe Ruth League introduced this prep league, comprising teams with only 13-year-old players, to foster more participation in the game for this age group. This league offers the 13-year-old player the assurance to play without age intimidation and the chance to participate in the 13-Year-Old World Series.

16–18 
The highest and most accomplished level in Babe Ruth Baseball. A favorite among high school players and coaches, this division prepares players for collegiate recruiting and the professional draft. This division allows players a chance to compete through a tournament trail to reach the 16–18 Year-Old World Series.

16 Year-Old Prep 
The primary objective of the 16-Year-Old Prep program is to provide players the opportunity to stay involved in organized baseball while sharpening their skills against competition in their own age group. Any league franchised in 16–18 Babe Ruth Baseball may also choose to register a 16-Year-Old Prep League.

Babe Ruth Softball 

Designed for girls ages 4–18, age divisions offered include: 6 & Under, 8 & Under, 10 & Under, 12 & Under, 14 & Under, 16 & Under and 18 & Under. The primary emphasis of Babe Ruth Softball is on education, skill development, participation for all levels of ability and of course, having fun.

A special highlight of Babe Ruth Softball is its annual tournament trail. Tournament teams from each local league are eligible to participate in District competition with winners advancing to the State and Regional levels. Entry to the official Babe Ruth Softball tournament trail is free. 12 & Under and 16 & Under Divisions advance to a World Series. Babe Ruth Softball also offers an invitational World Series for the 8 & Under, 10 & Under, and 14 & Under divisions.

Bambino Buddy-Ball 

The Bambino Buddy-Ball Division was established for organizations who wish to charter a league that encompasses players ages 5–20 who are either physically and/or mentally challenged. This division makes allowance for a “buddy” to help the player swing a bat, round the bases, catch a ball, etc.  There are no restrictions to the age of the “buddy”. A Bambino Buddy-Ball team may be composed of players ages 5–20 and sometimes older. The Bambino Buddy-Ball division is designed so that everyone has the opportunity to have fun.

The Bambino Buddy-Ball Division allows our challenged or special needs athletes to develop confidence and positive self-esteem.  It allows them to be part of organized sports and assists with physical fitness as well as their social skills.  The joy and emotion you experience when you put on that first baseball uniform or cap on a challenged child’s head is like no other.  As you can see, the Bambino Buddy-Ball Division is an emotionally rewarding experience for everyone as it also allows the “buddies” to feel good about helping their challenged friends, while at the same time making it a fun and memorable time for all.

Xtreme Fastpitch 

There are no geographical boundaries limiting where the players who sign up for an Xtreme team come from. Participating leagues can sign up a group of players from any geographical make-up and form a team to play other Xtreme teams in special games or tournaments throughout the year.

Xtreme teams are eligible to play at their own facility or in local tournaments. Playing rules match High School and College playing rules to better prepare players for the next level of competition.

Regions 
Babe Ruth League consists of 8 Regions.
 Ohio Valley – (Kentucky, Illinois, Indiana, Ohio, Michigan, Wisconsin, and West Virginia)
 Middle Atlantic – (New Jersey, New York, Delaware, Pennsylvania, Maryland, and Ontario)
 Midwest Plains – (Minnesota, Iowa, Missouri, Kansas, Colorado, Nebraska, South Dakota, North Dakota, Saskatchewan, and Manitoba)
 Southeast – (Virginia, Tennessee, North Carolina, South Carolina, Georgia, Florida, Bermuda, and Bahamas)
 Southwest – (Texas, Oklahoma, New Mexico, Arkansas, Louisiana, Mississippi, and Alabama)
 Pacific Northwest – (Washington, Oregon, Idaho, Montana, Wyoming, Alaska, Alberta, and British Columbia)
 Pacific Southwest – (California, Nevada, Utah, Arizona, Hawaii, and Guam)
 New England – (Maine, New Hampshire, Vermont, Massachusetts, Rhode Island, and Connecticut)

World Series

For a list of World Series champions, see footnote

Babe Ruth League offers 12 World Series to its leagues to compete in. The Babe Ruth World Series follows the tournament trail of Districts, States, Regionals, and the World Series. At the World Series, 8 Regional Champions along with the Host League and State Champion compete for the World Series Title. The World Series can be hosted by any chartered league which in turn gets an automatic bid into the World Series.

The Cal Ripken Major/70 World Series is hosted annually at Ballparks of America in Branson, MO. 8 International Teams compete for the International Championship with the winner playing the US Champion for the World Championship.
 Cal Ripken 10-Year-Old World Series
 Cal Ripken Major/60 baseball World Series (From 2000 to 2006, the U.S. Champion played an International Champion for the World Series title.)
 Cal Ripken Major/70 baseball World Series (The U.S. Champion plays the International Champion for the World Series title.)
 Babe Ruth 13-Year-Old World Series 
 Babe Ruth 14-Year-Old World Series 
 Babe Ruth 13–15 World Series
 Babe Ruth 16–18 World Series
 Babe Ruth Softball 8U World Series (Invitational)
 Babe Ruth Softball 10U World Series (Invitational)
 Babe Ruth Softball 12U World Series
 Babe Ruth Softball 14U World Series (Invitational)
 Babe Ruth Softball 16U World Series

Awards

World Series awards
World Series champions
Batting champions
Most Outstanding Players

Hall of Fame
The Babe Ruth League Hall of Fame was established in 1968. Individuals are inducted each year. Organizations are inducted from time to time.

Notable alumni 
 Tom Brady – San Mateo, CA
 Chris Drury – Trumbull, CT
 Michael Jordan – Wilmington, NC
 Jimmy Fallon – Saugerties, NY
 Bruce Springsteen – Freehold, NJ
 Jon Stewart – Lawrence, NJ
 Roy Williams (coach) – Wilmington, NC
 John Elway – Pullman, WA
 Scott Boras – Elk Grove, CA
 Jack Del Rio – Hayward, CA
 Mike Trout – Millville, NJ

Source:

References

External links

BabeRuthWorldSeries.org

Baseball in New Jersey
Children's sport
Softball competitions
Sports leagues established in 1951
1951 establishments in New Jersey
Non-profit organizations based in New Jersey
Youth organizations based in New Jersey
Youth baseball in the United States
Baseball governing bodies in the United States
Hamilton Township, Mercer County, New Jersey